Alex Hamill may refer to:

Alex Hamill (footballer, born 1961), Scottish footballer
Alex Hamill (footballer, born 1912), Scottish footballer